Live: Live Those Songs Again is the first live album by country music singer Kenny Chesney, released on September 19, 2006 via BNA Records. The album includes live renditions of 14 of his songs, ten of which were singles. "Live Those Songs", "Never Gonna Feel Like That Again", "On the Coast of Somewhere Beautiful", and "Back Where I Come From" were never released as singles by Chesney, although the latter was previously a single in 1990 for Mac McAnally from his album Simple Life.  The recordings for the album were taken from concerts in Carson, CA, Knoxville, TN, Nassau, Bahamas, Nashville, TN and Pittsburgh, PA.

Track listing

Musicians
Wyatt Beard – keyboards, background vocals
Kenny Chesney – lead vocals, acoustic guitar, electric guitar
James Fahlgren – steel drums
Jim Bob Gairrett – steel guitar, electric guitar
Tim Hensley – acoustic guitar, electric guitar, gut string guitar, background vocals
Nicholas Hoffman – fiddle, electric guitar, background vocals
Steve Marshall – bass guitar
Clayton Mitchell – electric guitar, background vocals
Sean Paddock – drums, percussion, background vocals

Charts

Weekly charts

Year-end charts

Certifications

References

Kenny Chesney albums
Albums produced by Buddy Cannon
2006 live albums
BNA Records live albums